Jawann Oldham (born July 4, 1957) is an American former professional basketball player who played center. After being selected by the Denver Nuggets in the second round (41st overall) of the 1980 NBA draft, he went on to play in ten National Basketball Association (NBA) seasons for eight teams.

Early life and college career
Oldham was born in Chicago and grew up in Seattle, where he attended Cleveland High School and Seattle University, with 1,530 points and 965 rebounds during his college career, after which he was drafted by the Denver Nuggets in the second round of the 1980 NBA draft.

Career

NBA
In his NBA career, Oldham played in 329 games and scored a total of 1,455 points, playing for the Nuggets, Houston Rockets, Chicago Bulls, New York Knicks, Sacramento Kings, Orlando Magic, Los Angeles Lakers and Indiana Pacers. He was the last Bulls player to wear #33 before Scottie Pippen.

International
Oldham won gold as part of the US basketball team at the 1979 Summer Universiade.

Post-NBA
He was instrumental in founding the Korean Basketball League in South Korea and the Continental Basketball Association in China in the 1990s, and developed and coached for the bj league in Japan; the Jawann Oldham Professional Development Basketball Academy operates in Dubai and Abu Dhabi.

NBA career statistics

Regular season

|-
|style="text-align:left;"|
|style="text-align:left;"|Denver
|4|| ||5.3||.333||–||–||1.3||.0||.0||.5||1.0
|-
|style="text-align:left;|
|style="text-align:left;"|Houston
|22||0||5.6||.361||–||.571||1.1||.1||.1||.5||1.5
|-
|style="text-align:left;"|
|style="text-align:left;"|Chicago
|16||0||10.7||.534||–||.545||2.9||.3||.3||.8||4.6
|-
|style="text-align:left;"|
|style="text-align:left;"|Chicago
|64||0||13.6||.505||–||.591||3.6||.5||.2||1.2||4.0
|-
|style="text-align:left;"|
|style="text-align:left;"|Chicago
|63||0||15.8||.464||.000||.680||3.7||.5||.2||2.0||3.4
|-
|style="text-align:left;"|
|style="text-align:left;"|Chicago
|52||47||24.5||.517||.000||.582||5.9||.7||.5||2.6||7.4
|-
|style="text-align:left;"|
|style="text-align:left;"|New York
|44||9||17.6||.408||.000||.544||4.1||.4||.5||1.6||3.9
|-
|style="text-align:left;"|
|style="text-align:left;"|Sacramento
|54||13||17.5||.476||–||.678||5.6||.6||.2||2.0||5.5
|-
|style="text-align:left;"|
|style="text-align:left;"|Orlando
|3||0||12.0||.333||–||.400||5.0||.0||.7||1.0||1.3
|-
|style="text-align:left;"|
|style="text-align:left;"|Los Angeles
|3||0||3.0||.667||–||.500||.3||.3||.0||.0||1.7
|-
|style="text-align:left;"|
|style="text-align:left;"|Pacers
|4||0||4.8||.500||–||–||.8||.0||.0||.0||1.5
|- class="sortbottom"
|style="text-align:center;" colspan=2|Career
|329||69||15.9||.479||.000||.607||4.1||.5||.3||1.7||4.4
|}

Playoffs

|-
|style="text-align:left;"|1985
|style="text-align:left;"|Chicago
|4||0||22.8||.467||–||–||5.5||.8||1.5||1.8||3.5
|-
|style="text-align:left;"|1986
|style="text-align:left;"|Chicago
|1||0||4.0||.000||–||–||2.0||.0||.0||.0||.0
|-
|- class="sortbottom"
|style="text-align:center;" colspan=2|Career
|5||0||19.0||.438||–||–||4.8||.6||1.2||1.4||2.8
|}

Head coaching record

bj league

|-
| style="text-align:left;"|Oita Heat Devils
| style="text-align:left;"|2005-06
| 16||4||12|||| style="text-align:center;"|Fired|||-||-||-||
| style="text-align:center;"|-
|-

References

1957 births
Living people
African-American basketball players
American expatriate basketball people in Japan
American men's basketball players
Basketball coaches from Illinois
Basketball players from Chicago
Capitanes de Arecibo players
Centers (basketball)
Chicago Bulls players
Chicago Rockers players
Denver Nuggets draft picks
Denver Nuggets players
Ehime Orange Vikings coaches
Houston Rockets players
Indiana Pacers players
Los Angeles Lakers players
Montana Golden Nuggets players
New York Knicks players
Oklahoma City Cavalry players
Orlando Magic players
Parade High School All-Americans (boys' basketball)
Rapid City Thrillers players
Sacramento Kings players
Santa Barbara Islanders players
Seattle Redhawks men's basketball players
Tulsa Zone players
21st-century African-American people
20th-century African-American sportspeople
American expatriate basketball people in Taiwan